Bat Hadar (lit. Daughter of Citrus) is a community settlement in southern Israel. Located near Ashkelon, it falls under the jurisdiction of Hof Ashkelon Regional Council.

History
The village was founded in 1994 by the regional council. Its name is derived from the Hadaria farm on whose land it was established.

References

Community settlements
Populated places established in 1994
Populated places in Southern District (Israel)
1994 establishments in Israel